In computing, a zooming user interface or zoomable user interface (ZUI, pronounced zoo-ee) is a graphical environment where users can change the scale of the viewed area in order to see more detail or less, and browse through different documents.  A ZUI is a type of graphical user interface (GUI).  Information elements appear directly on an infinite virtual desktop (usually created using vector graphics), instead of in windows. Users can pan across the virtual surface in two dimensions and zoom into objects of interest. For example, as you zoom into a text object it may be represented as a small dot, then a thumbnail of a page of text, then a full-sized page and finally a magnified view of the page.

ZUIs use zooming as the main metaphor for browsing through hyperlinked or multivariate information.
Objects present inside a zoomed page can in turn be zoomed themselves to reveal further detail, allowing for recursive nesting and an arbitrary level of zoom.

When the level of detail present in the resized object is changed to fit the relevant information into the current size, instead of being a proportional view of the whole object, it's called semantic zooming.

Some consider the ZUI paradigm as a flexible and realistic successor to the traditional windowing GUI, being a Post-WIMP interface.

History 
Ivan Sutherland presented the first program for zooming through and creating graphical structures with constraints and instancing, on a CRT in his Sketchpad program in 1962.

A more general interface was done by the Architecture Machine Group in the 1970s at MIT. Hand tracking, touchscreen, joystick, and voice control were employed to control an infinite plane of projects, documents, contacts, video and interactive programs. One of the instances of this project was called Spatial Dataland.

Another GUI environment of the 70's, which used the zooming idea was Smalltalk at Xerox PARC, which had infinite desktops (only later named such by Apple Computer), that could be zoomed in upon from a birds eye view after the user had recognized a miniature of the window setup for the project.

The longest running effort to create a ZUI has been the Pad++ project begun by Ken Perlin, Jim Hollan, and Ben Bederson at New York University and continued at the University of New Mexico under Hollan's direction. After Pad++, Bederson developed Jazz, then Piccolo, and now Piccolo2D at the University of Maryland, College Park, which is maintained in Java and C#. More recent ZUI efforts include Archy by the late Jef Raskin, ZVTM developed at INRIA (which uses the Sigma lens technique), and the simple ZUI of the Squeak Smalltalk programming environment and language. The term ZUI itself was coined by Franklin Servan-Schreiber and Tom Grauman while they worked together at the Sony Research Laboratories. They were developing the first Zooming User Interface library based on Java 1.0, in partnership with Prof. Ben Bederson, University of New Mexico, and Prof. Ken Perlin, New York University.

GeoPhoenix, a Cambridge, MA, startup associated with the MIT Media Lab, founded by Julian Orbanes, Adriana Guzman, Max Riesenhuber, released the first mass-marketed commercial Zoomspace in 2002–03 on the Sony CLIÉ personal digital assistant (PDA) handheld, with Ken Miura of Sony

In 2002, Pieter Muller extended the Oberon System with a zooming user interface and named it Active Object System (AOS). In 2005, due to copyright issues, it was renamed to Bluebottle, and in 2008, to A2.

In 2006, Hillcrest Labs introduced the HoME television navigation system, the first graphical, zooming interface for television.
 
In 2007, Microsoft's Live Labs released a zooming UI for web browsing called Microsoft Live Labs Deepfish for the Windows Mobile 5 platform.

Apple's iPhone (premiered June 2007) uses a stylized form of ZUI, in which panning and zooming are performed through a touch user interface (TUI). A more fully realised ZUI is present in the iOS home screen (as of iOS 7), with zooming from the homescreen in to folders and finally in to apps. The photo app zooms out from a single photo to moments, to collections, to years, and similarly in the calendar app with day, month and year views. It is not a full ZUI implementation since these operations are applied to bounded spaces (such as web pages or photos) and have a limited range of zooming and panning.

Franklin Servan-Schreiber founded Zoomorama, based on work he did at the Sony Research Laboratories in the mid-1990s. The Zooming Browser for Collage of High Resolution Images was released in Alpha in October 2007. Zoomorama's browser is all Flash-based. In 2010, project development ended, but many examples are still available on the site.

From 2008 to 2010, GNOME Shell used a zooming user interface for virtual workspaces management. This ZUI was eventually replaced by a different, scrolling-based design.

In 2017, bigpictu.re offers an infinite (pan and zoom) notepad as a web application based on one of the first ZUI open-source libraries.

In 2017, Zircle UI was released. It is an open source UI library that uses zoomable navigation and circular shapes.

References

External links 
 The Economist 2012 article about ZUI

Graphical user interfaces

User interface techniques
3D GUIs

id:Prezi